The Mazowe River (previously called Mazoe River) is a river in Zimbabwe and Mozambique.

The river rises north of Harare, flows north and then northeast, where it forms part of the border with Mozambique and joins the Luenha River, a tributary of the Zambezi River. In 1920, the Mazowe Dam was constructed on the river forty kilometres north of Harare to irrigate citrus farms.

The river and its tributaries are a popular site for gold panners and small placer operations, although in the wet season, the Mazowe becomes a raging torrent, often breaking its banks and causing damage to local communities and farms.

References 

 
Rivers of Zimbabwe
Rivers of Mozambique
Tributaries of the Zambezi River
International rivers of Africa
Mozambique–Zimbabwe border